The Nine Lives of Nestor Makhno is a 12-part mini-series which aired on Channel One Russia. The series is a historical biographical drama about the life of Nestor Makhno, a Ukrainian anarchist who was the commander of the Revolutionary Insurgent Army of Ukraine (Makhnovshchina). A 6-disc DVD set of the series is available.

Plot
The series tells the story about the life of Nestor Makhno and his Revolutionary Insurgent Army. During the 1905 Russian revolution, he joined the Union of Poor Peasants and carried out a campaign of expropriative anarchism. He was arrested and sent to Butyrka prison, where he received an education from Peter Arshinov before being granted amnesty during the February Revolution and released. His first steps were to organize communes in the Huliaipole region, later forming rebel detachments, which eventually grew into the Revolutionary Insurgent Army of Ukraine and played an influential role in the Russian Civil War. After it was defeated, Makhno fled into exile in France, where he would eventually die.

Cast

Reception

Critical response
The Nine Lives of Nestor Makhno received mixed reviews, with praise typically being reserved for the performance of Pavel Derevyanko as the titular Makhno, while criticism was generally focused on the series' lack of narrative structure and its poor direction.

Anastasia Krainer for Nash Film reviewed the series positively, exalting it for its historical accuracy. She particularly lauded Derevyanko's "soulful" performance, in which he "conveys Nestor's inner feelings, his passion, his pain, his eternal protest through gestures, intonations and glances. Sometimes it seems that he feels deeper, sharper than the role requires." However, she also criticized the series' direction, notably in a scene that featured Makhno and Pavel Dybenko drinking together, finding the performances on display "unbelievable". She concluded by stating that "this is not a masterpiece, but also not an empty glossy picture that has nothing to do with history."

On the other hand, the Russian Marxist Boris Kagarlitsky gave the series a negative review, criticizing the show's lack of narrative coherence as "events simply drag on one after the other in chronological order, without any internal connection, without any logic." He claimed that the show's writers had little understanding of the Russian Revolution, its causes and consequences, stating that "the [show] will tell you who won, but you will not be able to understand why. And most importantly, you will not be left with a sense of tragedy." He also criticized the casting of Leon Trotsky as the main antagonist, comparing his portrayal to "evil wizards" from children's stories.

Sergey Varshavchik for the Russian Journal was also critical of the series, pointing out its historical inaccuracy in respect to a fabricated sequence where Fedir Shchus murders Nestor's first wife Nastia, going further to attack it for its incoherent narrative and illogical set design, while also poking fun at the direction of the battle scenes.

Accolades

References

Further reading

External links
 
 The Nine Lives of Nestor Makhno on archive.org
 
 
 

2007 Russian television series debuts
2007 Russian television series endings
2000s Russian television series
Biographical films about military leaders
Biographical films about military personnel
Channel One Russia original programming
Cultural depictions of Nestor Makhno
Films about anarchism
Russian Civil War films
Russian drama television series
Russian television miniseries
Russian biographical television series